Idrissa Niang (born 25 February 1992) is a Senegalese professional footballer who plays as a defensive midfielder for Iraqi Premier League club Al-Shorta.

Club career
Niang started his career with the football academy of the AS Sucrière de La Réunion, he joined the junior team in 2008, before joining the first team in 2010. Niang then moved to ASC Diaraf during the 2012–13 season, where he played for five seasons. On 29 July 2017 Niang moved to Tunisia to play for ES Métlaoui during the 2017–18 season.

On 27 July 2018, he moved to Lebanon to play with Beirut-based club Nejmeh, staying there for two years. On 1 October 2020, Niang joined Iraqi Premier League side Al-Mina'a. He moved to Al-Talaba in August 2021.

International career 
Niang represented Senegal at the 2014 African Nations Championship qualification, making his senior international debut on 20 July 2013, in a 2–0 defeat to Mauritania.

Honours
Diaraf
 Senegal FA Cup: 2013

Nejmeh
 Lebanese Elite Cup: 2018
 Lebanese FA Cup runner-up: 2017–18

Al-Shorta
 Iraqi Super Cup: 2022

References

External links
 
 
 

1992 births
Living people
Senegalese footballers
Association football midfielders
AS Sucrière de La Réunion players
ASC Jaraaf players
ES Métlaoui players
Nejmeh SC players
Al-Mina'a SC players
Al-Talaba SC players
Al-Shorta SC players
Senegal Premier League players
Tunisian Ligue Professionnelle 1 players
Lebanese Premier League players
Iraqi Premier League players
Senegal international footballers
Senegalese expatriate footballers
Expatriate footballers in Tunisia
Expatriate footballers in Lebanon
Expatriate footballers in Iraq
Senegalese expatriate sportspeople in Tunisia
Senegalese expatriate sportspeople in Lebanon
Senegalese expatriate sportspeople in Iraq